Fast Movin' Train is the fourth studio album by American country music group Restless Heart. It was released by RCA Nashville in 1990. The title track, "Dancy's Dream," "When Somebody Loves You" and "Long Lost Friend" were released as singles. The album reached #6 on the Top Country Albums chart and has been certified Gold by the RIAA.

Track listing

 "The Truth Hurts" is only available on the CD version.

Personnel 

Restless Heart
 Larry Stewart – lead vocals, guitars
 Greg Jennings – guitars, mandolin, vocals
 David Innis – keyboards, vocals
 Paul Gregg – bass, vocals
 John Dittrich – drums, percussion, vocals

Additional Musicians
 Terry McMillan – harmonica, percussion

Production 
 Restess Heart – producers
 Tim DuBois – producer 
 Scott Hendricks – producer, engineer, mixing, additional recording, digital editing, mastering 
 Joe Galante – A&R direction 
 Mike Clute – engineer, additional recording 
 Chris Hammond – additional recording 
 Steve Bishir – assistant engineer 
 Jim DeMain – assistant engineer 
 John Hurley – assistant engineer 
 John Kunz – assistant engineer 
 Mark Nevers – assistant engineer 
 Gary Paczosa – assistant engineer 
 Carry Summers – assistant engineer 
 Carlos Grier – digital editing
 Denny Purcell – mastering 
 Mary Hamilton – art direction, design 
 Kym Juister – design
 Jim "Señor" McGuire – photography 
 Mastered at Georgetown Masters (Nashville, TN).

Charts

Weekly charts

Year-end charts

Certifications

References

1990 albums
Restless Heart albums
RCA Records albums
Albums produced by Scott Hendricks